Black Cat (Felicia Hardy) is a character appearing in American comic books published by Marvel Comics. Created by Marv Wolfman, Keith Pollard, and Dave Cockrum, the character first appeared in The Amazing Spider-Man #194 (July 1979). Throughout her history, Black Cat has sometimes been an enemy, love interest, and an ally of the superhero Spider-Man.

Felicia Hardy is the daughter of Walter Hardy, a world-renowned cat burglar. After suffering from a traumatic assault by an ex-boyfriend as a college freshman, she trained herself in various fighting styles and acrobatics and, after deciding to follow in her father's footsteps, adopted the costumed identity of the Black Cat. She has the subconscious ability to affect probability fields, producing "bad luck" for her enemies. The character was originally depicted as a supervillain and adversary of Spider-Man, but over time the two fell in love, which motivated her into becoming both an antiheroine, and his partner. However, their relationship grew complicated after it became apparent that Black Cat was only attracted to the alter ego of Spider-Man and had little interest in the hero's civilian life as Peter Parker. After their break-up, Black Cat maintained her role as one of Spider-Man's most trusted allies and for years the pair shared an on-again, off-again romance. Being a part of his supporting cast and one of his principal love interests, Black Cat has been featured in many media adaptations related to Spider-Man, including animated series and video games.

Felicia Hardy has been described as one of Marvel's most notable and powerful female antiheroes, being labelled as a femme fatale.

Felicity Jones played Felicia Hardy in the 2014 film The Amazing Spider-Man 2.

Publication history

In 1979, creator Marv Wolfman was looking for a female foil for Spider-Woman. He decided to base a character on a Tex Avery cartoon, "Bad Luck Blackie", in which a black cat brought misfortune to anyone in close proximity. The Black Cat's costume and appearance were designed by Dave Cockrum.

When Wolfman changed writing assignments within Marvel Comics to The Amazing Spider-Man, he brought his character with him. He and Cockrum made considerable changes to the character and her appearance over this time; the Black Cat intended to debut in Spider-Woman had only her name and powers in common with the one who finally appeared in The Amazing Spider-Man. On the bottom of the letters page of The Amazing Spider-Man #194 (July 1979), a thumbnail of the intended cover for Spider-Woman #9 (December 1978) appears along with a rejected cover for The Amazing Spider-Man #194. Wolfman said in an interview:I didn't plan Black Cat to be in Spidey. I created her for Spider-Woman (look at the letter column of the first B.C. story and you'll see). I then decided to leave Spider-Woman and moved her over. So, I never even thought of Catwoman when I did her. I got the idea for her from a Tex Avery cartoon, Bad Luck Blackie". Black Cat's first comic book appearance was drawn by Amazing Spider-Mans (at that time) regular penciller Keith Pollard.

Writer/director Kevin Smith began writing the Spider-Man/Black Cat: The Evil That Men Do miniseries in 2002. After the third issue the series went on a hiatus until 2005, when Smith revealed he had finally finished writing the scripts. Smith has stated, "While I have zero defense for my lateness (particularly when folks like Bendis turn out great stories in multiple books on a monthly basis), I will say this: it's a much better story now than it would've been had I completed it back in '02."

In the mid-2000s, she starred alongside Wolverine in a limited comic book miniseries titled Claws. A sequel to this miniseries, entitled Claws II, began publication in July 2011. Black Cat was a lead character in the 2006–2007 Heroes for Hire series.

The Black Cat ongoing series written by Jed Mackay debuted in June 2019.

Fictional character biography

Felicia Hardy was born in Queens, New York. Her father Walter pretended to be a traveling salesman but was a world-renowned cat burglar who, before his arrest, encouraged her to never settle for second best. If she loved basketball, she should work to become a basketball player and not just a cheerleader.

In Spider-Man/Black Cat: The Evil that Men Do, Black Cat herself reveals that as a freshman at Empire State University, she was raped by her boyfriend Ryan. Hating the idea of being a victim, she trained herself in various fighting styles and acrobatics, intent on killing him. Finally, after months of preparing, she set out for revenge, but before she could find him, Ryan was killed in a drunk driving accident. Furious that she was denied the chance for revenge, Hardy decided to utilize her new skills to follow in her father's footsteps. After amassing a fortune in stolen items, Felicia adopted her costumed identity.

She first dons the Black Cat costume to break her father out of prison. On the same night, she meets Spider-Man. Her father dies, and she then fakes her own death. Despite her antipathy towards men, Felicia feels a kinship with this lone hero; Spider-Man is the first man she felt she could trust and she grows to believe herself in love with him. Felicia looks for a way to earn his trust and continues with the Black Cat persona as a misguided attempt to attract his affection. Seeing the good in Felicia, Spider-Man makes every attempt to have her criminal record expunged.

Felicia is placed in a mental institution but escapes. She joins forces with Spider-Man against the Maggia. She is granted conditional amnesty, and again convinces Spider-Man that she has died.

The Black Cat finally finds the opportunity to prove herself after learning the Kingpin controls an incredibly powerful detonator. The Owl plans to use the weapon to hold New York City hostage. Meanwhile, Doctor Octopus plans to use the weapon to destroy the city altogether. However, the Black Cat uses her abilities to steal the item first and protect it from all parties. She gives the detonator to Spider-Man and becomes the target of Doctor Octopus' revenge. Although Spider-Man tears off his mechanical appendages, Octopus is still able to mentally control them and hold the Black Cat still while his men open fire. Spider-Man barely gets her to the hospital in time and as they operate on the dozens of bullet and knife wounds, Peter realizes just how much he cares for Felicia.

After she recovers, they begin a relationship and soon Peter reveals his identity to her. Felicia has difficulty accepting the fact that Peter is just a man beneath the mask and cannot understand his need for a civilian life. Peter is hurt, but continues the relationship since it was the first time he did not need to hide his life as Spider-Man from someone.

Initially, the "accidents" which seem to befall those who crossed the Black Cat's path are merely well-planned stunts and traps. After her near-death experience, Felicia fears her lack of superpowers make her a liability to Spider-Man. She is terrified that his overwhelming need to protect her will eventually get him killed, so Felicia seeks a way to make herself Spider-Man's equal. Felicia is offered an opportunity to undergo the same process that was used to create the Scorpion and the Human Fly. The Kingpin uses it on the Black Cat as payback for a theft she committed. Scared and ashamed of being empowered by the Kingpin of crime, she keeps her new abilities a secret from Peter. Her 'bad luck' power turns out to be infectious, and begins to jinx Spider-Man, which was exactly the Kingpin's intent. Feeling a wall of secrets growing between them, Spider-Man breaks up with Felicia. Felicia then begins a "Robin Hood crusade", stealing from the rich to give to the poor.

Peter soon realizes something is amiss with his own luck and enlists the aid of Doctor Strange to remove the "hex" on him. By doing so, he alters the hex's source and changes the Black Cat's powers in the process. She finds she has heightened strength, agility, balance, vision, and retractable claws. While burglarizing the mercenary known as the Foreigner, Black Cat is attacked by Sabretooth, the Foreigner's hitman; Spider-Man saves her life.

The Black Cat updates her look and her attitude and rekindles her relationship with Spider-Man. She makes peace with his need for a normal life as Peter Parker and stands by him while he is accused of murder as Spider-Man. Together, they track down the source of the elaborate scheme to frame him and fight the Foreigner. Her apartment is fire-bombed by the Foreigner's hitman Blaze, and she begins living with Peter Parker. Peter later discovers their relationship is just a ruse against him, and that she had secretly been in a relationship with The Foreigner. However, despite her anger during her ruse, Felicia begins to fall back onto her desire to love Peter. Spider-Man comes home to discover Black Cat discussing her plans to ruin his life by framing him for murder, during a telephone-conversation with The Foreigner. Before he can catch her, she escapes. Spider-Man tracks her down to the Foreigner's apartment by attempting to trick Lt. Keating into revealing evidence as Peter Parker. Peter then intercepts a phone-call on Keating's phone, which turns out to be Felicia, telling Keating to meet her. However this is a part of her plan, as she intentionally lured Spider-Man into finding her at the Foreigner's apartment, causing a fight to ensue between The Foreigner and Spider-Man. Later she clears Spider-Man of his murder charge. In the end, the Black Cat double-crosses the Foreigner and Spider-Man, detailing her plan and her feelings towards Peter in a letter, also explaining that she has fled to Paris to start a new life. This pushes Peter to find support and a new relationship with Mary Jane Watson.

Years later, the Black Cat returns to America, and goes "shopping" (actually shoplifting) with Dagger. She returns to her original costume, seeks out Peter Parker, and in a chance confrontation with Venom learns that Peter had married Mary Jane Watson. Angry and jealous, Felicia begins harassing the couple, taunting Peter as by dating his friend Flash Thompson. She physically threatens Mary Jane, confronting her and swearing to ruin their marriage. After Spider-Man uses a device to remove his superhuman abilities, the Black Cat aids him in finding the device again to restore them. In the process, the Black Cat's cat-like abilities are completely erased. She realizes that she sincerely cares for Thompson, but when she proposes marriage he refuses her, saying that he was only interested in her because she was the ex-girlfriend of his idol, Spider-Man, but is implied that Flash actually cared for her. The Black Cat later makes up with both Spider-Man and Mary Jane, becoming close friends with them. She subsequently purchases equipment from the Tinkerer to incorporate into her costume to compensate for her lost abilities, and occasionally teams up with Spider-Man.

After Spider-Man unmasks himself, Black Cat is enraged because she felt that they shared a bond over knowing his identity. Though she is dating Thomas Fireheart (a.k.a. Puma), her new romantic interest notes that Felicia may still have some romantic inclinations toward Peter.

The Black Cat joins the new Heroes for Hire during the "Civil War", though Misty Knight believes that she is just there for the money.

Marvel Divas
Black Cat returns in the limited series Marvel Divas (a parody of Sex and the City). She is one of the main characters, alongside Firestar, Hellcat, and Photon. The writers are Roberto Aguirre-Sacasa and Tonci Zonjic. Summoned by her friends to cope with Firestar's breast cancer, Felicia is financially broken: unable to restart her investigation firm, she is too proud to accept Puma's monetary assistance, and her attempts to get a loan are met with open hostility from the banks of New York, often targets of her villainous activities as the Black Cat. Thus, feeling rejected and angry, Felicia begins to consider returning to villainy.

Following Marvel Divas, Black Cat returns as a recurring character in The Amazing Spider-Man, following a storyline in #606–607 entitled "Back in Black Cat". Although she remembers her previous encounters with Spider-Man, the events of "One More Day" have erased her memory of his identity. Also, she has regained her "bad luck" powers.

Spider-Man ran into the Black Cat as she was breaking into the penthouse apartment of Dexter Bennett. Spider-Man caught up to her, reminding her that she was the one that dumped him. She and Puma had ended their relationship, so she and Spider-Man rekindle their relationship.The Amazing Spider-Man #607. Marvel Comics. Peter later enlists the Black Cat's help in getting back his vial of blood from Mister Negative.

Following this, Black Cat received her own four issue mini-series, which was written by Jen Van Meter, drawn by Javier Pullido and covered by Amanda Conner. In the series, Felicia became caught up in the events of "The Gauntlet" and "Grim Hunt" storyline after her mother Lydia was kidnapped by the members of the Kravinoff family. Felicia agreed to turn herself over to the Kravinoffs in exchange for her mother's freedom, but instead sent a decoy while she tracked down her mother and attempted to free her herself. After removing the duct tape from her mother's mouth, Felicia discovered that the Kravinoffs had strapped an explosive device to her wrists to kill both of them. Felicia is ultimately able to rescue her mother and keep her safe from the clutches of the Kravinoff family.

Mary Jane enlisted the Black Cat's help after Spider-Man was captured by Doc Tramma, who turned out to be the one who restored Felicia's bad luck powers. Together they managed to defeat Tramma and save Spider-Man, and agreed to become friends afterwards. Black Cat is next seen in the "Big Time" storyline helping Spider-Man retrieve some experimental vibranium the new Hobgoblin stole for the Kingpin.

Spider-Island
Black Cat appears in the Spider-Island story arc, fighting against the half-spider creatures, when the Heroes for Hire are called in to help with the quarantine of Manhattan.

Afterwards, Black Cat was blamed for the theft of a Holographic Projector from Horizon Labs. Since Spider-Man was with her at the time of the robbery he knew that she was innocent, and he recruited Matt Murdock (a.k.a. Daredevil) to help prove her innocence. It was later revealed that the criminal organization Black Spectre framed her to test her as part of their plot to recruit the Black Cat to their side and offer her a huge cash reward for retrieving a device that Matt Murdock has in his possession. Afterwards she goes to Matt's apartment and they start a relationship which is part of her plan.Daredevil vol. 3 #8 However she betrays Black Spectre and alerts Daredevil, leaving him a note saying the organization is monitoring his actions, before going into hiding.

Marvel NOW!
As part of the Marvel NOW! event, Felicia was later contacted by her friend, Misty Knight, other to help the Fearless Defenders fight the so-called Doom Maidens along with other heroines such as Storm, Tigra, Hellcat and Valkyrie.

Superior Spider-Man (Doctor Octopus' mind in Peter Parker's body) swings in his patrol heading for another date with his girlfriend Anna Maria Marconi only to bump into the Black Cat, who was committing a robbery. Felicia attempts to flirt, but suddenly Superior Spider-Man attacks her punching her straight into her face, taking out a tooth in the process. Superior Spider-Man continues the assault reminiscing about how he once tried to kill her, but now he was just apprehending her as a criminal. This leaves Felicia totally shocked and angry while swearing revenge after Superior Spider-Man wraps her in webbing. The Black Cat's capture is caught live for everyone to see. As a result, her criminal contacts distance themselves from her and her stolen treasures are sent back to their owners. This public humiliation hardens her to the core.

Following the conclusion of The Superior Spider-Man comics returning the true Spider-Man, Black Cat later escapes at the beginning of the new Amazing Spider-Man series when Electro stages a breakout at the prison where she was being held. Determined to regain her standing by defeating Spider-Man, she attacks him while he is trying to evacuate a burning building, forcing Spider-Man to pretend to still be Doctor Octopus to drive her away as he cannot afford to lose time rescuing civilians. Felicia then makes contact with Electro, suggesting that they collaborate in seeking revenge on Spider-Man. Black Cat is in Parker Industries, making a record of all the tech they are currently producing. However she does not understand them, and opts to 'steal' someone who does. Sajani has had enough of Peter's constant disappearances and vows to make Peter see how he deals with everything without her help. Black Cat then pulls her away, commenting on her perfect timing. Black Cat and Electro later raid Eel's hideout where she has Electro defeat him. Black Cat and Electro later show up at a meeting between Mister Negative and Phil Urich (who is now leading the remnants of the Goblin Underground as the self-proclaimed Goblin King) where they throw Eel's body in between them. Black Cat states to Mister Negative and Phil Urich that she has heard about how they were outed by Spider-Man and wants in on their plan. During Peter's interview on the Fact Channel, Electro attacks the security team on the channel and Black Cat arrives announcing her demand that if Spider-Man does not show up in fifteen minutes, Peter will be dead. Electro complains about the plan but Black Cat stays determined that Spider-Man will show up, but then Silk arrives to confront them both, giving Peter the time to change into Spider-Man and jump into action, naming Silk. As she battles against Electro and Spider-Man deals with Black Cat, J. Jonah Jameson remains on the channel forcing the cameraman to film the action. Spider-Man tries to convince Black Cat to stop even while she does not believe his story of being mind-swapped. Black Cat deviates one of Electro's bolts, hitting Spider-Man and knocking him down in the process. Black Cat attempts to unmask Spider-Man as Jameson aims the camera, but Jameson's angle prevents anyone seeing Spider-Man's face long enough for Silk to knock Black Cat back and Spider-Man to put his mask back on. Although Electro accepts being depowered when his uncontrollable abilities prove dangerous even to himself, Black Cat continues her vendetta against Spider-Man regardless of who is behind the mask. Following Electro's depowerment, the criminals at the Bar with No Name want Black Cat to lead them.

The final issue of The Superior Foes of Spider-Man reveals that Boomerang's love interest was in fact Black Cat, who had disguised herself in order manipulate Boomerang and his Sinister Six into helping her acquire a priceless portrait of Doctor Doom without a mask. The character next appears as the villain of Hawkeye vs. Deadpool, where she is revealed to have used an associate's expertise in mind control to infiltrate New York's law enforcement and judicial systems, and create an army of "drones" out of the patients and staff of Brooklyn Psychiatric. When a hacker who had acquired a list of all active S.H.I.E.L.D. agents, who Black Cat intends to brainwash as well, betrays her, Felicia hires Typhoid Mary to help her acquire the USB flash drive containing the list, opposed by Deadpool, Hawkeye, and Kate Bishop. When cornered by the trio and the authorities, Black Cat murders the mind control specialist, and escapes by switching places with her arresting officer, a sleeper agent.

In the Slide-Away Casino, Melter and Killer Shrike take Ringer to the back room where Black Cat is waiting. Black Cat shows him various items and tells him that even she cannot steal everything and sometimes must pay for them and asks him how is she supposed to do that when nobodies like him do not pay her weekly cut. Ringer tells her he did not pay because he was captured by Silk, owed the Spot for getting him out of jail, and had to pay the Tinkerer for new equipment. He also tells Black Cat they worked in some works before and remembers her having a heart and asks for compassion. Black Cat hesitates long enough for the Ringer to attack them, hitting her in her arm before she takes him down. Black Cat tells Ringer that he will make three times the cut and will also serve as an example by having Killer Shrike and Melter beat him up. Black Cat is surprised Ringer could tag her as she normally is more lucky. She wonder if it was luck to remind her of who she is now and tests her luck with one of the casino's machines and wins. Black Cat notices that lately the harder she listens to the part of her that tells her not to let anyone put her down, the more her luck gets off the charts. She remembers her life in the elite class before she lost it all. Melter and Killer Shriek bring in Ringer and Black Cat tells him to spread the word that no one steals from her. Two years ago, Felicia Hardy presents a painting in an elite party. In the present day at a museum, Regina Venderkamp, the woman who bought all the items confiscated from the Black Cat in an auction, presents the same painting that Felicia did. However, the lights go out for a moment and the painting is gone. An enraged Regina and her bodyguards go to her apartment only to find all of her treasures gone. She goes upstairs to see if she also took everything there, despite a bodyguard protesting since Black Cat could still be there. Black Cat then appears and says she couldn't leave without Regina learning that no one takes from Black Cat without paying. Regina orders her bodyguards to attack, but Black Cat quickly takes them out. She reflects that her bad luck powers seem to work better when she is ruthless and she may have been holding back before. Black Cat throws one of her claws to Regina's neck causing her to pass out. Hours later, Regina wakes up handcuffed to a chair at Black Cat's hideout. Black Cat contemplates almost all of the items that were confiscated and those she retrieved with only one missing. In J. Jonah Jameson Sr. and Aunt May's apartment, they contemplate the last item the only thing they got at the auction and go watch TV unaware that the Black Cat plans to steal it back. Following Spider-Man's fight with Ghost at Parker Industries, Black Cat places the statue with the rest of her things while having Aunt May, J. Jonah Jameson Sr., and Regina Venderkamp tied up. Jay asks her why did she took them as she doesn't need money and they didn't do nothing to her. Felicia pours gasoline around her apartment and tells Jay he is wrong as they bought her things in the auction, a collection she spent years acquiring. She tells him that's the problem with possessions, they can break, you can lose them or they can be taken. And when that happens, everyone thinks they can take what's yours unless you prove them wrong. She says that nothing and no one will have that hold on him before setting the apartment on fire. When Spider-Man arrives, May warns him that the Black Cat is still in there and Peter asks Felicia for help. She tells him to save them if he wants as she made her point and the more people know the better. Parker tries to convince her that this isn't her but she tells him that the Felicia he knew is gone and she is done being who others want. She tells her that she controls her fate and anyone who stands before that will also be gone. Spider-Man manages to save Aunt May, J. Jonah Jameson Sr., and Regina, who screams at him for not saving her things before May shushes her, telling her that people are what count, not things and Spider-Man knows that. In the Slide-A-Way Casino, Black Cat tells her men that they have seen what happens when they stay on her good side and what happens when they cross her. But from now on, there's nothing holding her back and no limit to what she will do.

All-New All-Different Marvel
As part of the "All-New, All-Different Marvel", Black Cat took in Silk as the latest member of her gang. Unbeknownst to Black Cat, Silk is secretly doing working undercover for S.H.I.E.L.D.

Black Cat established a criminal empire which is disbanded by Gwenpool and Howard the Duck.

Black Cat formed an alliance with Hammerhead, his nephew, and his henchmen.

During the "Civil War II" storyline, Black Cat took in Kingpin's former minion Janus Jardeesh as the latest member of her gang. She was later informed about Janus undergoing Terrigenesis and arrived at the scene. During one of the heists by Black Cat's gang, Black Cat encountered the Avengers. She, Fancy Dan, and Janus Jardeesh evaded capture. Afterwards, Black Cat decided to lay low for a while.

Black Cat gained Scorpion as a part-time enforcer for her gang. She hired ex-Army Ranger Lee Price to accompany Scorpion to the black market sale where there was shootout with Tombstone's gang. When at Black Cat's hideout, Scorpion accuses Lee Price of botching up the black market sale which Lee Price denied leading Black Cat to demand an explanation after hearing about some information from her spies at the New York City Police Department telling her what they know.

During the Venom Inc. storyline, after Lee Price steals the spawn of the Venom symbiote from Flash Thompson's protege Andi Benton aka Mania and uses it to become Maniac, with his newfound ability to reproduce the symbiote and gain control of people, Price was able to gain control of Black Cat and her gang. With the aid of Flash's new powers as Anti-Venom, Black Cat was freed. Later working with Venom, Black Cat was able to use the artificial Anti-Venom element they got from Dr. Steven to free Spider-Man from Price's control. During the final battle, Black Cat discovers that those already cured cannot be taken over by Price's symbiote again, allowing Spider-Man to use his cured bloodstream and mix it with Anti-Venom to defeat Price. Afterwards she and Spider-Man make peace, and later Eddie Brock convinces Black Cat to give up being a crime boss and go back to being a vigilante.

Fresh Start
During Marvel's "Fresh Start", Black Cat teamed up with Spider-Man to confront the Thieves Guild, a group of robbers established hundreds of years ago that was trying to make their name known again by stealing the equipment of various super heroes. As an honorary member of the Guild, she was able to allow the two to break in and fight off Guild members until the rest of the heroes showed up to reclaim their items. Later that night, Felicia tells Spider-Man that her darker mentality didn't start when Doctor Octopus arrested her, but instead when she forgot Spider-Man's secret identity as a result of Doctor Strange making everyone forget it after a Civil War, feeling that she lost a significant part of her life in the process. In response, Peter takes off his mask and reveals his secret to Felicia, which she gladly accepts. Afterwards, Kindred (Harry Osborn) learns of Spider-Man's rekindled friendship with Black Cat and claims that Peter "drags everyone into his own Hell".

During the "Last Remains" storyline, Black Cat gets her hands on the Hand of the Vishanti and makes a 3D replica of it. This attracts the attention of Doctor Strange who wants it back. Black Cat reluctantly gives it to him in exchange that she helps to save Spider-Man's soul. After the Order of the Web helps Doctor Strange in fixing the Brooklyn Bridge, Black Cat is instructed by Doctor Strange to guard the Hand of the Vishanti as he takes Madame Web's advice to use in tracking Kindred.

Powers and abilities
Initially, the Black Cat had no superhuman abilities. Later, a test induced by the Kingpin gave her the psionic ability to affect probability fields; essentially, she could produce "bad luck" for her enemies. The "bad luck" power entails that under stress she is subconsciously able to cause anyone in her immediate vicinity that she perceives as a threat to be susceptible to freak accidents, like guns jamming and exploding, or tripping on objects. This ability also had the side effect of eventually causing problems for anyone spending long periods of time around her.

Doctor Strange eventually tampered with her powers that briefly removed her bad luck abilities, along with the unwanted side effect. However, this magical tampering temporarily endowed her with cat-like abilities, giving her night vision, retractable talons in her fingertips, superhuman speed, strength, agility and endurance, proportionate to a cat.Web of Spider-Man Vol 2 #11. Marvel Comics. Her psionic "bad luck" powers and former temporary abilities were eventually restored by Doctor Tramma through the use of cybernetics.Web of Spider-Man vol. 2 #12. Marvel Comics.

The Black Cat has reflexes, agility, and stamina of an Olympic level acrobat. She is physically very strong and athletic and has great physical endurance. She is an excellent street fighter capable of taking on several armed assailants and incapacitating them without being injured herself. She is trained in several martial arts styles, including Judo and Goju Ryu Karate. Hardy is a talented photographer; while dating Spider-Man she takes pictures of the hero that he admits are better than his own work.

The Black Cat has also acquired several devices from the Tinkerer that increase her agility and heighten her strength. She wears earrings that interact with the balance centers of her brain to grant her enhanced agility. She has contact lenses that let her see in various ranges of the electromagnetic spectrum, such as infrared and ultraviolet. Her costume contains micro-servos that enhance her strength above normal human levels. The gloves of her costume contain steel micro-filaments, which form retractable claws at the fingertips when she flexes her fingers (triggering a magnetic surge which condenses the filaments into polarized talons) which enable her to tear through most surfaces and easily scale walls. Using this equipment, the Black Cat has been able to beat enemies who have superhuman abilities.

The Black Cat has a miniature grappling hook device hidden in the "fur" of each glove, designed by her father Walter Hardy which enables her to swing from buildings in a manner similar to Spider-Man, though not quite as fast. She can also use the cable from this device as a tightrope, wall scaling device, swing line, or as a weapon in combat.

 Cultural impact and legacy 

Critical reception
Liam McGuire of Screen Rant referred to Black Cat as a "fan-favorite figure in the comics," writing, "The character has become an A-list character in the comics, as her costume, personality, and playfulness - all displayed in the piece - have captured the attention of readers and turned Black Cat into an antihero they are thrilled to see pop up in stories." Elliot Swan of CBR.com called Black Cat "interesting and complex," saying, "She has proven herself as a hero worthy of the chance to develop outside the web of Spider-Man and has developed beyond being a footnote in the life of Marvel's iconic web-slinger. [...] Jed Mackay has been instrumental in igniting a new era of passionate fanfare for Black Cat, and she is very deserving of the acclaim. Felicia Hardy has not only been loyal to Spider-Man, but she continues to be an exciting three-dimensional heroine who shines outside the shadows of her male counterparts." Joseph Baxter of Den of Geek described Black Cat as an "A-list Spider-Man character," stating, "Felicia initially arrived as a formidable-fighter of a thief in the web-thwipping crosshairs of Spidey, having learned the trade from her legendary thief of a father. However, she eventually proved that she possesses a moral fiber, which resulted in Felicia becoming an ally against evil and on-again-off-again romantic interest for Spidey (in a dynamic that one could argue too closely mirrors DC’s Batman and Catwoman). Regardless, the character has remained a staple in Spidey’s comic book universe." Peyton Hinckle of ComicsVerse referred to Black Cat as "the shining example in comics of an independent woman who can find happiness outside of relationships," asserting, "Thankfully, we somehow, against the odds, have Black Cat, who completely defies those norms. She’s a bluntly sexual character who is also hilarious. She doesn’t have to be a man to crack a joke about body parts or to banter with Spider-Man about the Green Goblin’s latest hair cut. Her willingness to be sexually appealing doesn’t mean she can’t snort when she laughs. She can be smart, sexy, funny, and creative and still be the same woman."

Jesse Schedeen of IGN asserted, "Spider-Man doesn't have a lot of iconic female villains (Peter Parker isn't the type to punch a girl if he can help it), but he does have Black Cat. Black Cat is similar to Catwoman, both in the sense that she's a skilled thief who dresses with a cat motif and because she has a complicated and sometimes romantic relationship with Spidey. That's not to say Felicia Hardy is a carbon copy of Selina Kyle. She's a complex character who looks out mostly for herself and struggles to move forward from a rough youth." Eric Diaz of Nerdist wrote, "Although initially created as a Catwoman-like, sexy cat burglar villain for Spider-Man to fight back in 1979, much like her DC counterpart, Felicia Hardy had a soft spot for the hero she battled the most. Eventually, Felicia got romantically involved with Spidey, and she learned his true identity long before his main squeeze Mary Jane ever did. Over the years, she has had several stories which focused on her and developed her backstory, making her way more than just Marvel’s Catwoman." Dana Forsythe of Syfy stated, "Beloved as one of the Marvel Universe’s best burglars and foil to the amazing Spider-Man, Felicia Hardy has walked the fine line of anti-hero and villain since she made her debut in Amazing Spider-Man #194. Created by writer Marv Wolfman and illustrators Keith Pollard and Frank Giacoia, the highly skilled cat burglar first crossed paths with Spider-Man while trying to free her father from prison." Susana Polo of Polygon stated, "Catwoman predates Black Cat by several decades, and they’re both infamous female cat burglars who wear black, skintight costumes. They both have “cat” in their name. And they both enjoy a will-they-won’t-they relationship with an urban male superhero — Batman and Spider-Man, respectively — who feels conflicted about dating them because of their illegal activities. But the unlikely truth is that all of those similarities are pure coincidence — or maybe just Felicia Hardy’s bad luck to be created second [...] Stories of deliberate ripoffs and open inspiration are so common in the comics world that nobody could be faulted for thinking there was some funny business going on in Black Cat’s creation. But what actually happened is even more interesting. Black Cat and Catwoman are a rare, genuine example of convergent evolution."

Anthony Orlando of BuzzFeed said, "Now that Peter and MJ have officially separated, now is the perfect time for him to meet the Black Cat. Born Felicia Hardy, this cat burglar became Spider-Man's partner/girlfriend, and she has repeatedly fought alongside him over the years, making her increasingly popular with fans. Though she may seem like a copycat of Catwoman, Hardy is still a fascinating and complex character all her own, and she could provide much-needed support to Spider-Man in his new, lonely life." Joshua Medina of MovieWeb stated, "With Tom Holland's Spider-Man having fantastic success in the MCU and possibly getting a second trilogy of movies, fans can only hope to see the stunning and cunning Black Cat in action. She is quite literally Spider-Man's Kryptonite in human form; she is such a pure and seductive beauty." Rachel Leishman of The Mary Sue called Black Cat "incredibly interesting," writing, "For a character who is beloved in the world of comics, Felicia Hardy hasn’t really had her time. By that, I mean her time in the live-action world. With three separate movie franchises built around Peter Parker, you’d think that we’d have more of her in our films. Instead, we have Felicity Jones in The Amazing Spider-Man 2, and … that’s pretty much it. (Granted, we were supposed to have her in one of the Raimi films, but alas.) So now, with a plethora of rumors surrounding the Spider-Verse (like the fact that we could be getting a show led by Silk and the Olivia Wilde movie heading our way) and who we’re going to get in the live-action form, my pitch is for a Black Cat anything Whether it’s just in the Tom Holland movies or in a franchise all her own, Felicia Hardy deserves her time." Nahila Bonfiglio of The Daily Dot asserted, "One of the things that many viewers love about the current iteration of Spider-Man is his charming innocence, something that doesn’t mesh well with a character like Black Cat. While every iteration of Peter Parker arries some degree of good-natured naiveté, at his current age, he’s better equipped to handle adversaries who don’t utilize their sex appeal. In the future, however, Black Cat would make a welcome addition to the MCU, as a cameo or full movie. Fans of the comics and films alike would love to see Peter Parker mature, and the inclusion of such an engaging, complicated antiheroine would no doubt delight viewers. We don’t know if it will ever happen, but here’s hoping the future sees plenty more Black Cat on the big—and small—screen."

Accolades
 In 2009, IGN included Black Cat in their "Marvel's Femme Fatales" list.
 In 2014, Comicbook.com ranked Black Cat 7th in their "7 Best Female Characters from the Spider-Man Multiverse" list.
 In 2014, IGN ranked Black Cat 24th in their "Top 25 Spider-Man Villains" list.
 In 2015, Bust ranked Black Cat 7th in their "13 Female Marvel Characters Who Kick Ass" list.
 In 2019, WhatCulture ranked Black Cat 10th in their "Every Upcoming & Rumoured Spider-Man Movie (Ranked By Hype)" list.
 In 2019, CBR.com ranked Black Cat 3rd in their "Spider-Man: His 10 Best Sidekicks" list.
 In 2020, Scary Mommy included Black Cat in their "195+ Marvel Female Characters Are Truly Heroic" list.
 In 2020, Screen Rant included Black Cat 10th in their "Marvel's 10 Best Heroes Who Use Luck To Their Advantage" list.
 In 2020, CBR.com ranked Black Cat 10th in their "Marvel's 10 Best Heroes Who Use Luck To Their Advantage" list.
 In 2020, Sideshow ranked Black Cat 3rd in their "Top 10 Cat-Themed Comic Book Characters" list.
 In 2021, Screen Rant ranked Black Cat and Spider-Man 3rd in their "10 Best Relationships in Spider-Man Comics" list and 10th in their "10 LGBTQ+ Marvel Heroes That Should Join The MCU" list.
 In 2021, CBR.com ranked Black Cat 3rd in their "10 Best Spider-Man Villains Missing From No Way Home" list.
 In 2021, Screen Rant included Black Cat in their "Spider-Man: 10 Best Female Villains" list.
 In 2022, Screen Rant ranked Black Cat 10th in their "10 Spider-Man Villains Fans Grew To Love" list, and included Black Cat in their "10 Best Marvel Characters Who Made Their Debut In Spider-Man Comics" list, in their "10 Spider-Man Villains That Should Get A Solo Movie" list, in their "10 Most Powerful Vigilantes In Marvel Comics" list, and in their "10 Best Spider-Man Comics Characters Not In The MCU" list.
 In 2022, Screen Rant ranked Black Cat 10th in their "10 Most Powerful Silk Villains In Marvel Comics" list.
 In 2022, CBR.com ranked Black Cat 2nd in their "Spider-Man's 10 Coolest Allies" list, 5th in their "10 Most Attractive Marvel Villains" list, 9th in their "10 Best Cat-Themed Superheroes In Comics" list, 10th in their "10 Spider-Man Villains Fans Grew To Love" list, and 11th in their "25 Best Anti-Heroes In Marvel Comics" list.

 Literary reception 

Volumes

 Spider-Man/Black Cat: Evil That Men Do - 2002 
According to Diamond Comic Distributors, Spider-Man/Black Cat: The Evil That Men Do #1 was the 2nd best selling comic book in June 2022. Spider-Man/Black Cat: The Evil That Men Do #1 was the14th best selling comic book in 2002.

Shawn S. Lealos of Screen Rant ranked the Spider-Man/Black Cat: The Evil That Men Do comic book series 1st in their "10 Must-Read Comics Written By Clerks Creator Kevin Smith" list, writing, "One of the most controversial comic book storylines Kevin Smith ever wrote came with Marvel Comics' series Spider-Man/Black Cat: The Evil That Men Do. The controversy here was part of the Women in Fridges concept, as Smith had someone sexually assault Black Cat as a kickoff for the story. The series attempted to look at how this assault turned Felicia into the woman she became, but the problem is that this was not a series that fans liked reading at the time because it took Smith four years to finish it. The first issue hit in 2002, and he didn't release the sixth and final issue until 2006. Now, fans can pick up the entire series and read it all the way through for one of Smith's more thoughtful comic book stories." Kirsten Murray of CBR.com ranked the Spider-Man/Black Cat: The Evil That Men Do comic book series 7th in their "10 Greatest Black Cat Stories Ever" list, saying, "Kevin Smith's six-part miniseries is controversial for a few reasons, but it is still a key entry in Black Cat's canon. Spider-Man and Black Cat find themselves begrudgingly working together again when their cases overlap. But things take a dark turn when Felicia is arrested for the murder of rapist, Garrison Klum: A crime she didn't commit. Facing the death penalty, Peter hires Matt Murdock to act as her lawyer, with the pair dedicated to saving their feline friend. It's not a series for the faint-hearted, as Smith tackles some difficult and disturbing subject matter, revealing the tragic past of not one but two infamous Spider-rogues."

Claws - 2006
According to Diamond Comic Distributors, Claws #1 was the 60th best selling comic book in August 2006. Claws #2 was the 69th best selling comic book in September 2006. Claws #3 was the 71st best selling comic book in October 2006.

Craig Lines of Den of Geek stated, "The tone of Jimmy Palmiotti and Justin Gray’s script, although quite violent, is very much classic romantic adventure, with Wolverine and Black Cat trading flirtatious banter and saucy body language as they splat bad dudes. It’s the sort of naughty comedy-action romp that Kevin Smith started and should’ve finished with his failed The Evil That Men Do mini-series (as opposed to the jumbled, misogynistic angst-fest it became). Whilst not exactly challenging, there are some good laughs and even a touch of suspense. In addition to zippy writing, the artwork is also consistently nice. I liked Joe Linsner’s interpretation of the Black Cat costume and, having seen her drawn so atrociously in recent years (come on down, Clayton Crain), Claws scores points on that front alone. On the down side, the mini-series is maybe an issue too short and I personally felt it lost its pace a little in Issue Three with an extended (and utterly unnecessary) flashback sequence, but otherwise, Claws is a sharp little critter and well worth getting your paws on." Kirsten Murray of CBR.com ranked the Claws comic book series 5th in their "10 Greatest Black Cat Stories Ever" list, saying, "An unlikely duo teamed up in three-part miniseries, Claws. Wolverine and the Black Cat find themselves held captive in cages on a mysterious island, confronted by a group of hunters led by someone claiming to be Kraven the Hunter. If the pair make it to a boat waiting to take them to their rescue on the other side of the island, they can go free. However, they have to evade the huntsmen. An action-packed adventure ensues, with Wolverine and Black Cat working together effectively as they dodge bullets, rockets, and even killer robots. Their sharp back-and-forth and willingness to get their hands dirty made this series so popular, it spawned a sequel."

Claws II - 2011
According to Diamond Comic Distributors, Claws #1 was the 130th best selling comic book in July 2011.

Jesse Schedeen of IGN gave Wolverine & Black Cat: Claws #1 a grade of 6.5 out of 10, asserting, "Jimmy Palmiotti and Justin Gray offer up another rollicking adventure that's heavy on action and laughs and light on anything resembling substance. There's really no deep connection to exploit between the title heroes, so this story plays out like another take on the Wolverine/Domino dynamic from X-Force: Sex + Violence. It would have been nice to see the writers throw a new batch of villains into the mix rather than Arcade and White Rabbit. The humor also borders on being too silly and simplistic at times, such as the scene where a villain crashes into a hot dog cart and elicits a stereotypical New Yorker reaction from those around him. Again, the story is good, dumb fun, but too heavy on the dumb at times. In any case, the main appeal with either volume of Claws lies in seeing Joseph Linsner try his hand at Marvel's stable. For the most part, that's enough to sell the book. Linsner's work is sexy, playful, and dynamic - an all-around perfect fit for the script. Sure, his Wolverine is some bizarre amalgamation of hairless ape and furry were-beast, but at least he's back to being short and ugly. Lighthearted romps are all good and well. Where Claws II will find its greatest challenge is in competing with books like Astonishing Spider-Man & Wolverine. That series has proven a comic can offer simple, unfettered fun and still rank as one of the best of the year. Claws can't get by with coasting on the bare minimum."

Black Cat - 2019
Vol. 1
According to Diamond Comic Distributors, Black Cat #1 was the best selling comic book in June 2019, with over 250 000 sold units. Black Cat #1 was the 4th best selling comic book of 2019.

Sam Stone of CBR.com compared Black Cat #1 to Ocean's 11 and The Thomas Crown Affair, writing, "Fun, true to the character, and action-packed, the inaugural issue of Black Cat is a top-down joy to read both for longtime fans of the character while being completely accessible to new readers. The creative team seamlessly mixes genres and explores the possibilities of the character without shying away from Felicia Hardy's recent villainous history. Reestablishing the character as a cool, confident burglar with her own checkered past, Black Cat #1 sets the stage for a heist-oriented adventure in the heart of the Marvel Universe for its eponymous protagonist." Charlie Ridgely of Comicbook.com called Black Cat #1 a "surprisingly enjoyable read," saying, "Black Cat #1 is a simple and grounded, but exciting series that gives an underutilized character the chance to shine on her own. It's not perfect, but it gets better as it goes along and is certainly well-worth your time, if you're looking for a new series to try out."

Vol. 2
According to Diamond Comic Distributors, Black Cat #2 was the 8th best selling comic book in July 2019. Black Cat #2 was the 89th best selling comic book in 2019.

Charlie Ridgely of Comicbook.com gave Black Cat #2 a grade of 4 out of 5, asserting, "Color me surprised once again, but Black Cat is a good book. It's a caper-heist comic that continues to be better than you'd think it has any right to be, turning a supporting character like Felicia Hardy into an effortlessly compelling leading force. It's almost impossible not to be captured by her, as well as the characters around her. Everything at work in this book was already great, but adding in a crazed Merlin and a trip to the Sanctum Santorum make it even better. It's time to add this one to your pull list."

Black Cat - 2020
According to Diamond Comic Distributors, Black Cat #1 was the 29th best selling comic book in December 2020.

Sam Stone of CBR.com described Black Cat #1 as a "solid relaunch," stating, "MacKay and Villa reunite to take springboard Black Cat's latest comic off the back of "King in Black", staying true to the spirit of the character and their previous series while managing to complement the bombastic crossover event. MacKay and Villa succeed in making this opening issue feel more like a tie-in to the crossover's story than several of the previous issues bearing the "King in Black" tie-in banner. Despite the new #1, Black Cat's relaunch keeps very much in line with what came before it while inviting new readers to jump on for a thrill ride as Felicia rises as the Marvel Universe's unlikely greatest savior." Tanner Dedmon of Comicbook.com called Black Cat #1 an "excellent jumping-on point," asserting, "Black Cat also has a surprisingly reserved presence in her own debut issue, but that's again owed to everything occurring around her. Seeing Black Cat slay symbiote dragons might have been memorable, but considering how other heroes have performed against similar threats, it never would've been believable. As such, Black Cat sometimes gets overshadowed during the more explosive moments of Black Cat #1. That type of action was never her game anyway—"above my pay grade," she says at one point in the issue—so her sacrifice of the spotlight was a necessary one to set her up for an opportunity to do what she does best. Like Captain America's confidence imbued in her, Black Cat's resolve is infectious, easily carrying whatever comes next in her new series."

Giant-Size Black Cat: Infinity Score - 2021
According to Diamond Comic Distributors, Giant-Size Black Cat: Infinity Score #1 was 24th best selling comic book in December 2021.

Dustin Holland of CBR.com called Giant-Size Black Cat: Infinity Score #1 the "perfect ending for Black Cat and the Infinite Destinies Crossover," asserting, "Giant-Size Black Cat: Infinity Score #1 gives Felicia the heroic ending she deserves. The issue delivers a fun, action-packed story that addresses numerous characters and storylines without rushing anything. MacKay and Villa give Black Cat the opportunity to finish one of the most important jobs of her storied career. Felicia definitely still has some unfinished business, but this ending encapsulates the spirit of the Black Cat series perfectly." Adam Barnhardt of Comicbook.com gave Giant-Size Black Cat: Infinity Score #1 a grade of 4.5 out of 5, saying, "Jed MacKay's time with Black Cat has already been exceptional enough—then you factor in a stellar one-shot like Infinity Score, and it takes everything to a whole other level. Here, you have Felicia Hardy using half of the Infinity Stones for a relatively small purpose in the cosmic scheme of things—but it's an extremely personal and heartfelt reason as to why she does. And that's where MacKay often succeeds most: making these bombastic heroes as human as they can be. Hardy sets out to do her biggest score, regardless of the costs and she aces it, in more ways than one. As far as finales go, it's hard to imagine Infinity Score being a better endcap. For a street-level character that oftentimes aligns herself with the slimiest characters in the entire Marvel stable, Black Cat: Infinity Score #1 is packed to the brim with heart and a certain warmth that's perfect for the holiday season."

 Mary Jane & Black Cat: Beyond - 2022 
According to Diamond Comic Distributors, Mary Jane & Black Cat: Beyond #1 was the 21st best selling comic book in January 2022.

Sayantan Gayen of CBR.com referred to Mary Jane & Black Cat: Beyond #1 as a "thrilling tale peppered with drama and intrigue," writing, "It is not an exaggeration to say that Mary Jane & Black Cat: Beyond #1 features one of the best Marvel crossovers in recent history. Jed MacKay writes an equally beautiful team-up of Black Cat and Ben Reilly in the Death of Doctor Strange: Spider-Man #1. Needless to say, MacKay has a good grasp on the character of Felicia Hardy and has found a seamless way to connect her with other characters across the Spider-Man mythos. Mary Jane and Black Cat may look at each other as romantic rivals, but the instant bonding between the two and the comfort they feel in each other's company is heartwarmingly beautiful to see. Mary Jane & Black Cat: Beyond #1 is an enthralling and charming tale." Hannibal Tabu of Bleeding Cool gave Mary Jane & Black Cat: Beyond #1 a grade of 8 out of 10, saying, "Jed MacKay has done some great work in building the legend of the Black Cat over the last few years, and this issue carries through the fruits of those labors in a Felicia Hardy that's quick to improvise but just as considerate and calculating."

 Iron Cat - 2022 
According to Diamond Comic Distributors, Iron Cat #1 was the 11th top advance-reordered comic book between May 23, 2022, and 29, 2022.

I-J Wheaton of CBR.com called Iron Cat #1 a "neon-tinted team-up comic," saying, "Iron Cat #1 draws together many elements of the mythos that have been steadily building around Black Cat. It is very exciting to see a relative newcomer like Black Cat being pushed further into the mainstream with a team-up with a prominent Marvel character like Iron Man. With any luck, we'll see a whole new generation of readers checking out Black Cat and her previous solo comics. That being said, Iron Cat #1 is as much about the future as it is the past, and this first issue sets the stage for a thrilling adventure." Logan Moore  of ComicBook.com gave Iron Cat #1 a grade of 4 out of 5, asserting, "Iron Cat gets off to a very fun start here in issue #1. In short, this series sees Black Cat and Iron Man coming together to go after a common enemy known as Iron Cat. This opening issue does a great job of quickly introducing all the major players in this story while also catching readers up on important aspects of previous Black Cat storylines. I'm curious to see what kind of legs Iron Cat has, but for now, I'm very excited to see how this series develops."

Other versions
House of M
In the House of M reality warp, Felicia Hardy appears as the Black Cat, having gained her powers through the Kingpin. She, alongside Elektra, Bullseye, Gladiator, and Typhoid Mary, are among the Kingpin's top assassins, however she is a double agent for Luke Cage's "Avengers" and feeds them information whenever she can. The Kingpin knows this and has Bullseye and Elektra beat her, while he throws her out a window. She survives and tells Luke that they have been set up, along with the Wolfpack and the Dragons. She stays with the group and is a more vocal member of Luke Cage's resistance. She takes part in the final battle at Genosha.

Marvel Adventures: Spider-Man
In issue #14 of vol. 1 of this all-ages series, Spider-Man battles the Black Cat.

Marvel Mangaverse

In the Marvel Mangaverse continuity, Black Cat is cybernetically enhanced. She was originally a simple thief, who stole a cursed magical amulet for its monetary value, but this act attracted the attention of Matt Murdock, the Devil Hunter, and she was cut in half. The Kingpin of Crime reconstructed her body with cybernetics, including a shut-down mechanism he planned to activate if she failed to serve him. After completing her mission for the Kingpin, he claimed to have permanently deactivated the mechanism, but whether he kept his word or not remains to be seen. She is still Spider-Man's old flame, but in the New Mangaverse storyline (with Spider-Man having chosen Mary Jane Watson over her) she is trying to move on, and is now showing a romantic interest in Wolverine though by the end of the story arc it is clear that she has a hidden agenda as she is later seen with Nick Fury.

Marvel Noir
In Marvel Noir, Felicia Hardy is the owner of "The Black Cat", a speakeasy that caters to the most powerful and corrupt in New York City. In Spider-Man Noir: Eyes without a Face, she takes on a more prominent role, sheltering Peter after he is almost killed by Sandman, as well as dating Crime Master. Like most incarnations, Felicia has a relationship with Spider-Man Noir. Crime Master slashes her when he finds out about this, but before passing out, she alerts the FBI that he is in league with Otto Octavius and his inhumane experiments. The final panel of the series shows her with a mask similar to Madame Masque, angrily refusing to see Spider-Man since she blames him for her scars.

During the "Spider-Verse" storyline, she was assaulted by Kingpin and his men in hopes of extracting the identity of Spider-Man, but with nothing to lose anymore she retains her silence. She was then used as a hostage to lure Spider-Man in accepting Mysterio's challenge. After the battle, she would secretly grab the blood of Spider-Man which was extracted earlier to avoid it falling into Mysterio's hands. She would later appear tending to an injured Spider-Man Noir (accompanied by Silk and Spider-Woman) while on the run from the Inheritors.

Marvel Zombies
A zombified Black Cat is briefly seen battling Iron Fist. He punches a hole straight through her. However, somehow (in Marvel Zombies: Dead Days) during events set after her appearance above (which happened in Marvel Zombies vs. The Army of Darkness), she appears alive and well, also uninfected on one of S.H.I.E.L.D.'s Carriers.

When asked about this during his Joe Friday 100, Joe Q explained that "the MZ world is not exactly like the regular Marvel Universe. Our Captain America is their "Colonel America". Their Reed Richards is evil. A lot of the costumes are from different eras in our world. We assumed it was obvious from the context that in the MZ world, Felicia Hardy has a twin sister, Felicity Hardy, who is the costumed adventurer known as Night Cat".

MC2
In the alternate future comics known as MC2, Felicia Hardy married Flash Thompson and had two children, Felicity and Gene, before they divorced. In this continuity, she has apparently retired the identity of the Black Cat and runs a private detective agency. She has begun a romantic relationship with Diana, a woman she works with, a fact that has produced tension between herself and her daughter.

 Night-Spider 
The 2022 End of the Spider-Verse event introduced an alternate version of Felicia that has Spider-Man's powers. On Earth-194, she gained super powers when she was bitten by a Delvadian Spider-Idol statue she stole from Ambassador Anton Rodriguez. As Night-Spider, she uses her new powers for heists where she constantly getting the best of her friend Detective Jean DeWolff. Night-Spider eventually gives herself up to Jean as her powers have made stealing too easy and has taken away the thrill of it. Before she is arrested, Anya Corazon arrives on Earth-194 requests her help in stopping a threat that endangers the Spider-Verse, which Night-Spider accepts due to the scope of the challenge.

Secret Wars (2015)
During the Secret Wars storyline, the Battleworld domain of New Quack City featured a version of Black Cat who is an anthropomorphic black cat. She is a crime boss and known as "The Cat Lady". The Cat Lady hired private investigator Howard the Human to find a spy within her organization, but someone was able to find him before Howard and killed him. The Cat Lady then gave Howard twelve hours to find the assassin. Otherwise, she would kill him. Howard figured out that the informant was playing possum on orders from a simian version of Wilson Fisk who wanted to take his main rival the Cat Lady down. She confronts him and Adrian Toomes at a bar but they are both arrested as Howard planned. Howard kept the informant Peter Possum alive to get the reward money from the district attorney and to have Peter testify against Felecia.

Spider-Gwen
On Earth-65, Felicia and her father are French and professional burglars. When her father stole Wilson Fisk's first dollar, Fisk sent Matt Murdock to kill him. Felicia went on to become a famous musician after singing in the streets and has a band called the Black Cats. She had a concert in New York with Mary Jane as the opening act to which she invited Murdock with the intention to kill him. While there, Murdock unleashes the Hand where she is defended by Spider-Woman. When she attempts to kill Matt, Spider-Woman knocks her out.

Spider-Man: Fairy Tales
In Spider-Man: Fairy Tales, which is based on Little Red Riding Hood with Mary Jane in the title role, a black cat named Felicia appears as Mary Jane's pet. In the third issue, which is based on a Japanese ghost story, features a demoness resembling a humanoid black cat with long white hair.

Spider-Man Loves Mary Jane
Felicia Hardy makes her appearance in issue #17 of the series. She is a teenager who transfers to the same high school attended by Peter Parker and Mary Jane Watson. Felicia is considered "bad luck" due to her violent past and confrontational personality. She flirts with Flash and challenges his girlfriend, Liz Allan, to a fight, which was merely a ruse to establish her reputation as a girl not to be messed with.

Supernaturals
A different version of Felicia Hardy is part of a team led by Brother Voodoo. Unlike her 616 counterpart, this version of Black Cat possesses enchanted vocal abilities that allow her to alter the outcomes of events by speaking certain phrases aloud (for example, at one point, saying "Break" causes a noose to snap). This ability is shown to be useless once Jack O'Lantern tapes Felicia's mouth shut.

Ultimate Marvel

In the Ultimate Marvel universe, the Black Cat is Felicia Hardy, a young woman who blames her father's death on Wilson Fisk, the Kingpin.In this version, the Black Cat actually has short brunette hair and wears a white-haired wig as part of her costume. Seeking revenge, she stole a priceless tablet that he was going to use on his comatose wife. Kingpin hired the assassin Elektra to retrieve it. When Black Cat threw it into the harbor, Elektra threw one of her sai into the Black Cat's chest, sending the thief over the edge. She was presumed dead, though no body was found.

She later returned during a gang war, stopping Hammerhead from shooting Spider-Man in the right temple. She later expressed interest in working for Hammerhead if it would mean getting rid of the Kingpin although Spider-Man opposed this. She later assisted Hammerhead and Elektra in a confrontation against Moon Knight, Shang-Chi, Iron Fist, and Spider-Man.

Later, after the crisis was resolved, she passionately kissed Spider-Man through his mask, her previous interest in him having gotten stronger. She had apparently no idea of the age disparity between her and Peter, and mistakenly assumed, after he left in a rush, that he was a married man. When she managed to unmask him and realized how young he truly was, she was repulsed. The shock and embarrassment of such a discovery caused her to vomit on his costume. She is next seen trying to assassinate the Kingpin. However, Mysterio beats her to it. She then tries to steal the Zodiac Key from the Kingpin's vault. Mysterio, knowing that it contained great power, tried to steal it from her. Felicia tried to wish Mysterio to go away, but instead she accidentally caused the key to create a massive explosion. Shocked by what she did, she handed it over to Mysterio. Spider-Man came to the scene with Iron Man. Mysterio subdued Iron Man and then Spider-Man, Mysterio, and Felicia then fought over the key. Spider-Man won and then both he and Felicia decided to help the people who were caught in the middle of Felicia's mistake.

What If?
Black Cat was featured in two What If? storylines:

 In What if the Alien Costume had Possessed Spider-Man?, after the symbiote forms a permanent bond with Spider-Man due to Mister Fantastic being unable to examine the web-slinger until it is too late to break them apart, Felicia goes on a brief crime spree until she learns that the symbiote—which here lives on adrenaline from superhumans—has abandoned the now-deceased Spider-Man in favor of the Hulk; she favors killing the Hulk over the objections of the other heroes. After Spider-Man's funeral, she is contacted by the Kingpin, who helps her develop a weapon that will kill the symbiote in exchange for a lifetime of service from her; despite the heroes having already defeated the symbiote thanks to the actions of Thor and Black Bolt, with Doctor Strange being about to banish it, Felicia kills the symbiote anyway, subsequently berating the heroes for not knowing the price she had to pay to ensure that justice was done.
 In another storyline, Spider-Man marries the Black Cat rather than Mary Jane – Alistair Smythe's attack having left Mary Jane injured in this reality, leaving Peter doubting his ability to look after her, with he and Felicia rekindling their romance while fighting supervillains together, but their relationship is complicated by such factors as Peter and Felicia being unable to live together to preserve his secret identity. After Felicia's carelessness results in Spider-Man's identity being discovered by an unidentified informant, combined with her own jealousy over Peter's continued friendship with Mary Jane, she is killed by Paladin after he mistakenly assumes she attempted to kill Mary Jane, resulting in Peter forming a romantic relationship with Silver Sable as the two bond over their shared grief at the loss of their loved ones.

In other media
Television

 Black Cat appears in the Spider-Man (1981) episode "Curiosity Killed the Spider-Man", voiced by Morgan Lofting.
 Felicia Hardy / Black Cat appears in Spider-Man: The Animated Series, voiced by Jennifer Hale. This version was originally Peter Parker's first love interest before he met Mary Jane Watson, leading to Felicia dating Michael Morbius and later Jason Phillips. Additionally, Felicia comes from a wealthy background as her mother is the head of the lucrative Hardy Foundation while her father, John Hardesky, was tricked by the Nazis into sneaking into an American lab during World War II to memorize the super-soldier formula that created Captain America and report back to the Red Skull. At the last moment, Hardesky realized the deception and ran away to a life of crime. In the present, he was held in a S.H.I.E.L.D. prison before the Kingpin breaks him out. On Kingpin's behalf, Doctor Octopus kidnaps Felicia as leverage and to use her as a guinea pig for an improved super-soldier formula and introduce her to the father that she never knew. The formula proves a success, enhancing her overall physical prowess and granting her the ability to transform between her normal blonde form and her empowered white haired form at will. Using her new power, she recruits Spider-Man to help her rescue Hardesky and destroy the super-soldier formula. After Morbius turns himself into a vampiric entity, Felicia grapples with her feelings for him while trying to stop him. Along the way, she joins forces with Spider-Man, Morbius, and Blade to stop the Vampire Queen from creating an army of vampires. Following this, Felicia leaves New York to work with Blade and Morbius, though she returns to help Spider-Man defeat Hydro-Man and attend Peter and Mary Jane's wedding. In the three-part episode "Secret Wars", Spider-Man pulls Felicia away from a mission with Blade and Morbius to help him and a group of superheroes combat a group of supervillains assembled by the Beyonder. Once the battle is over, she is returned to the moment she was pulled from with no memory of what happened.
 Black Cat appears in The Spectacular Spider-Man, voiced by Tricia Helfer. This version lacks powers. Black Cat frequently flirts with Spider-Man until she tries and fails to break her father Walter Hardy out of prison, souring her relationship with Spider-Man.
 Black Cat appears in Spider-Man (2017), voiced by Grey DeLisle. This version possesses her comic counterpart's bad luck abilities.
 Sony canceled its planned female team-up film Silver & Black (see below) in August 2018 with the intention of reworking it as two separate solo films focusing on each of the title characters — Felicia and Silver Sable. Silver & Blacks planned director Gina Prince-Bythewood was expected to remain involved as a producer. By January 2020, the project was believed to be in development as a television series, which Prince-Bythewood confirmed in April 2020. She suggested that it could be a limited series, and had the potential to be released on Disney+.
 Black Cat appears in Spidey and His Amazing Friends, voiced by Jaiden Klein.

Film
 Black Cat appeared in early scripts for Spider-Man 2 as part of a subplot in which she tries to convince Spider-Man to give up being Peter Parker. This idea was to contrast with the other subplot of Peter giving up being Spider-Man. Though she was removed in later scripts, the Black Cat and her subplot are used in the film's tie-in video game. Felicia Hardy was then originally supposed to appear in Sam Raimi's Spider-Man 4 as a secondary love interest of Parker's, though she would not have transformed into the Black Cat, as in the comics. Instead, Raimi's Felicia was expected to become a new super-powered figure called the Vulturess'''. In March 2013, Raimi stated that Anne Hathaway would have played Black Cat if Spider-Man 4 had been made.
 Felicia Hardy appears in The Amazing Spider-Man 2, portrayed by Felicity Jones. This version works for Oscorp and has a "special relationship" with the Osborns. After taking control of the company, Harry Osborn promotes Hardy over members of Norman Osborn's former inner circle. She was intended to become the Black Cat in future films in the series before it was cancelled.
 In March 2017, it was officially reported that Sony Pictures was developing a Black Cat and Silver Sable-centered film with writer Christopher Yost, a project previously revealed following the Sony Pictures hack in 2014, with Jones intended to reprise her role as Hardy from The Amazing Spider-Man 2. It was intended to be a part of a shared universe called Sony's Spider-Man Universe, which is centered on characters from the Spider-Man mythology and began with the live-action film Venom in 2018. The films were to be more adult-oriented and despite taking place in the "same reality" as the Marvel Cinematic Universe, would not crossover with each other. In May 2017, it was announced that Gina Prince-Bythewood would direct the film, now titled Silver & Black. Production was supposed to begin in March 2018, but has since been delayed "indefinitely". Prince-Bythewood said the cause of the delay was script issues. While the film was initially scheduled to be released on February 8, 2019, Sony removed the release date from their schedule. Production was now slated to begin in 2019. In August 2018, Sony announced that Silver & Black was canceled in favor of having both characters starring in their own feature films. Black Cat was reportedly a re-worked version of the Silver & Black script while the studio were searching for screenwriters for Silver Sable. Prince-Bythewood would have served as a producer on both projects. As of April 2020, the film is now believed to be cancelled in favor of the proposed television series.

Video games
 Black Cat appeared as a playable character in Spider-Man: The Video Game.
 Black Cat appears as an assist character in Spider-Man and Venom: Maximum Carnage.
 Black Cat appears in Spider-Man (2000), voiced by Jennifer Hale.
 Black Cat appears in the main console version of Spider-Man 2 (2004), voiced by Holly Fields. Throughout the game, she tries to persuade Spider-Man to "ditch" his normal life for a permanent life as Spider-Man. While she is ultimately unsuccessful, she understands his decision.
 Black Cat appears as a playable character in Spider-Man: Friend or Foe, voiced by Audrey Wasilewski. She joins S.H.I.E.L.D. to help stop the P.H.A.N.T.O.M. invasion shortly before Spider-Man was sent to investigate the P.H.A.N.T.O.M.s' presence in Tokyo. There, Spider-Man encounters Black Cat trying to break into Doctor Octopus' lab and persuades her to join his team.
 Black Cat appears as a boss and assist character in Spider-Man: Web of Shadows, voiced again by Tricia Helfer in the Microsoft, PlayStation, Wii, and Xbox versions and by Valerie Arem in the Nintendo DS version. After Spider-Man sees her leaving Fisk Tower, he assumes she is working for the Kingpin and gives chase. Following her defeat, Black Cat reveals that she is actually a double agent trying to thwart the Kingpin's illegal activities in an attempt to impress Spider-Man, for whom she still has feelings. The player is then presented with the choice of rejecting or returning her feelings. If the latter choice is made, Spider-Man will work with Black Cat against the Kingpin. Regardless of the choice made, Black Cat will become an ally. Later in the game, amidst a symbiote invasion, Black Cat gets infected by one of the creatures and attacks Spider-Man, who defeats her with Mary Jane Watson's help. However, Black Cat is left grievously wounded by the battle, forcing Spider-Man to choose between leaving her in Mary Jane's care or infecting her with another symbiote to heal her. If the latter choice is made, Black Cat will become Spider-Man's "queen" in one of the game's two black suit endings, in which he takes over the symbiote army.
 In the PlayStation 2 and PlayStation Portable versions of the game, Black Cat is placed under mind control by Spencer Smythe before Spider-Man defeats her and is faced with the choice of either destroying the mind-control device to free her or allowing it to kill her so he can claim the device for himself.
 A Marvel 2099-inspired version of Black Cat appears as a boss in Spider-Man: Edge of Time, voiced by Katee Sackhoff. According to her in-game profile, Alchemax acquired the original Black Cat's DNA when she came to the company looking for a way to halt or reverse the aging process. Though she escaped after realizing the extent of Alchemax's corruption, they created clones of her as a security force. One clone in particular was given the Vanisher's teleportation powers, instilled with extreme agoraphobia so that she would not be tempted to escape their corporate headquarters, upgraded with cybernetic weaponry, given claws on her fingers, and led to believe they force-fed her anti-aging pills. After defeating several other Black Cat clones, Spider-Man encounters and fights the special clone. Following her defeat, Black Cat implies that she still has feelings for him before disappearing. Later when Spider-Man 2099 sets off to confront Alchemax's CEO, he is forced to fight the remaining Black Cat clones along with other Alchemax guards.
 Black Cat appears as a playable character in Marvel Super Hero Squad Online, voiced by Tara Strong.
 Black Cat appears as a playable character in Marvel: Avengers Alliance.
 Felicia Hardy appears as a boss in The Amazing Spider-Man film tie-in game, voiced by Ali Hillis. This version is initially a patient at Beloit Psychiatric Hospital who escapes after Spider-Man's attempt to break out Curt Connors accidentally releases all the other patients. Following this, Felicia forms a small gang of hired thugs, mercenaries, and urban commandos to rob St. Gabriel's Bank. When Spider-Man arrives to foil the heist, he fights and defeats Felicia in the bank's underground levels before handing her over to the police. In a secondary photo mission, it is revealed that Felicia escaped once again, taken on the Black Cat persona, and mysteriously gained superpowers.
 Black Cat appears in LittleBigPlanet as part of the "Marvel Costume Kit 6" DLC.
 Black Cat appears in Marvel Heroes.
 Black Cat appears as a playable character in Lego Marvel Super Heroes, voiced by Laura Bailey.
 Black Cat appears as a boss in The Amazing Spider-Man 2 film tie-in game, voiced again by Ali Hillis. It is revealed that the Kingpin broke Felicia out of prison, gave her super-powers through Ravencroft's illegal cross-species experiments, and ordered her to kill Spider-Man. Adopting the Black Cat alias, she makes two attempts on Spider-Man's life and is defeated in the second, whereupon she reveals the Kingpin's identity as Wilson Fisk to Spider-Man and what he did to her. She also claims she never wanted to hurt Spider-Man and that she willingly took part in the experiment so that she could be like him and be with him. After Spider-Man rejects her advances and offers to protect her from the Kingpin, Black Cat refuses his help and escapes. In the mobile version of the game, Black Cat is a supporting character and ally who informs Spider-Man of various crimes taking place around the city and helps him fight enemies in several missions.
 A teenage version of Black Cat appears in Disney Infinity 2.0, voiced again by Tara Strong.
 Black Cat appears as a playable character in Spider-Man Unlimited, voiced once again by Tara Strong.
 Black Cat appears as a playable character in Marvel: Future Fight.
 Black Cat appears as a playable character in Marvel Avengers Academy, voiced by Mel Gorsha.
 Black Cat appears as a playable character in Marvel Puzzle Quest.
 Black Cat appears in Spider-Man (2018) and its DLC, The City That Never Sleeps, voiced by Erica Lindbeck. This version is the successor to her father and previous Black Cat, Walter Hardy, and was previously in a relationship with Spider-Man years prior.
 Black Cat appears in Marvel Snap.

Miscellaneous
 Black Cat appears in Spider-Man: The Darkest Hours, by Jim Butcher.
 Black Cat appears in the novel Spider-Man and The Incredible Hulk: Rampage, by Danny Fingeroth and Eric Fein.
 Black Cat appears in the Marvel Universe Live!'' as a member of the Sinister Six.

Collected editions

References

External links
 
 Black Cat's Profile at Spiderfan.org
 

Action film villains
Catgirls
Characters created by Dave Cockrum
Characters created by Marv Wolfman
Comics characters introduced in 1979
Fictional characters from New York City
Fictional characters who can manipulate probability
Fictional crime bosses
Fictional mercenaries in comics
Fictional professional thieves
Marvel Comics American superheroes
Marvel Comics characters who can move at superhuman speeds
Marvel Comics characters who have mental powers
Marvel Comics characters with superhuman senses
Marvel Comics characters with superhuman strength
Marvel Comics female superheroes
Marvel Comics female supervillains
Marvel Comics martial artists
Marvel Comics mutates
Marvel Comics sidekicks
Marvel Comics titles
Spider-Man characters
Video game bosses
Vigilante characters in comics
Villains in animated television series